Daniel Williams II (born December 15, 1969) is a former professional American football defensive end in the National Football League. He was drafted 11th over all in the 1993 draft, after the Denver Broncos traded up three spots to acquire him. He played for the Broncos (1993–1996) and the Kansas City Chiefs (1997, 1999–2001). Williams sat out the entire 1998 season amidst a contract dispute after being tagged as the Chiefs' franchise player.  He now resides in Roswell, Georgia.

1969 births
Living people
Sportspeople from Ypsilanti, Michigan
Players of American football from Michigan
American football defensive ends
American football defensive tackles
Toledo Rockets football players
Denver Broncos players
Kansas City Chiefs players